Omar Ernesto Muraco (1930 – 28 November 2010) was a footballer and later manager of the Nicaragua national football team and the Panama national football team.

C.D. FAS
Nicknamed el Petiso Goleador, Muraco played two seasons with FAS, winning one championship with the club which included him winning top goalscorer for the season with 22 goals.

References

External links

"El Petiso Goleador", Omar Ernesto Muraco... - CD FAS 

1930 births
2010 deaths
Argentine footballers
Club Atlético Huracán footballers
F.C. Motagua managers
C.D. FAS footballers
C.D. Águila footballers
C.S.D. Municipal players
C.D. Marathón managers
Diriangén F.C. managers
Argentine football managers
Nicaragua national football team managers
Panama national football team managers
Expatriate football managers in Honduras
Expatriate football managers in El Salvador
Expatriate football managers in Nicaragua
Expatriate football managers in Panama
Expatriate football managers in Guatemala
Expatriate football managers in Costa Rica
Expatriate footballers in El Salvador
Expatriate footballers in Guatemala
Argentine expatriate sportspeople in Guatemala
Argentine expatriate sportspeople in Nicaragua
Argentine expatriate sportspeople in Panama
Association footballers not categorized by position